Asylum is an upcoming horror video game developed by Senscape, an independent video game developer located in Buenos Aires, Argentina. The game is being authored by Agustín Cordes, who previously designed the game Scratches for the now-defunct developer Nucleosys. Taking place in a fictional insane asylum called the Hanwell Mental Institute, players will be able to fully explore the institute, which is partially based on elements of real asylums. The game will have "twisty storytelling" and "horrifying revelations", and an atmosphere-focused style of horror, much like Scratches.

The game was officially announced on July 9, 2010 after a previous viral marketing campaign that involved a series of online videos posted on YouTube alleged to be posted by an escaped inmate called Leonard Huntings. A fake website for the Hanwell Mental Institute was also created. The first official screenshots were posted on August 12, 2011.

On January 29, 2013, Agustín Cordes opened a Kickstarter campaign to raise , which would be used to accelerate the game's development. On February 28, 2013, it successfully raised , thus securing additional fundings to port the game to iPad and Android.

References

External links

Developer Senscape website
Indie video games
IOS games
Kickstarter-funded video games
Linux games
MacOS games
Psychological horror games
Single-player video games
Steam Greenlight games
Video games developed in Argentina
Video games set in psychiatric hospitals
Windows games
Upcoming video games